Lemsi is one of the four villages on the island of Kihnu, in southwestern Estonia. Administratively it belongs to Kihnu Parish, Pärnu County. The village is situated on the eastern side of the island. In 2000, Lemsi had a population of 145.

The Kihnu Harbour and Kihnu St. Nicholas' Church is located in Lemsi.

Gallery

References

Villages in Pärnu County